SU2 may refer to:

 SU-2, a scout version of the Vought O2U Corsair biplane
 SU(2), a special unitary group in mathematics
 SU2 code, a suite of open-source software tools written in C++ for the numerical solution of partial differential equations
 Sukhoi Su-2, a Soviet reconnaissance and light bomber aircraft used in the early stages of World War II

Asteroids
 3158 Anga (provisionally 1976 SU), a minor planet discovered on September 24, 1976
 5499 (provisionally 1981 SU), a minor planet discovered on September 29, 1981
 7887 Bratfest (provisionally 1993 SU), a minor planet discovered on September 18, 1993